Filip Antonijević (born 24 July 2000) is a Serbian footballer who plays as a left-back for Serbian SuperLiga club Vojvodina.

Club career

Early years
Antonijević was brought up through the ranks at Partizan.

Teleoptik
In August 2018, Antonijević moved to Teleoptik on a free transfer. He made his competitive debut for the club on 12 August 2018 in a 1–0 away victory over Novi Pazar. He scored his first competitive goal for Teleoptik about a month later, on 17 September 2018 in a 1–1 away draw with Metalac Gornji Milanovac. His goal, scored in the 88th minute, leveled the scores at one.

References

External links

2000 births
Living people
Serbian footballers
Association football defenders
Footballers from Belgrade
FK Teleoptik players
FK Kolubara players
FK Metalac Gornji Milanovac players
MTK Budapest FC players
FK Vojvodina players
Serbian First League players
Serbian SuperLiga players
Nemzeti Bajnokság I players
Serbian expatriate footballers
Expatriate footballers in Hungary
Serbian expatriate sportspeople in Hungary